Rolan Stanislavovich Khugayev (born 30 January 1985) is a former Russian football player.

Club career
He made his Russian Premier League debut for FC Alania Vladikavkaz on 17 October 2004 in a game against FC Saturn Ramenskoye.

External links
 

1985 births
Living people
Russian footballers
FC Spartak Vladikavkaz players
Russian Premier League players
FC Olimpia Volgograd players
Association football forwards